Brijesh Patel  (born 24 November 1952) is a former cricketer who played for the Indian national cricket team as a right-handed batsman from 1974 until 1979. After retirement, he served as chairman of the Indian Premier League between 2019 and 2022.

Biography 

Patel played in 21 test matches from 1974 to 1977, and sustained a batting average of 29.45. He was also a bowler, but was never asked to deliver his right-arm off breaks for his national team. His highest test score was 115 not out. He was regarded as an excellent fielder normally covering areas around cover and point. He was never dismissed for a duck in international cricket.

His international career came to a premature end because of his suspect technique against genuine pace. While his international cricketing career was not particularly productive, he made 37 hundreds and over 11000 runs in first class cricket. At the time of his retirement, he held the Ranji Trophy records (since bettered) for most runs and hundreds. His talent first became evident as a student in Bishop Cotton Boys School, Bangalore, and he represented his country in a junior team that traveled to Australia. Throughout his career, he represented Karnataka state and captained the team to many victories. He and fellow international Gundappa Vishwanath formed a formidable batting pair.

After his playing days he became cricket administrator. A Jagmohan Dalmiya (Ex President of BCCI) supporter, Patel was appointed the Director of the National Cricket Academy in India until he was replaced in 2005 by another ex-Test cricketer, Shivlal Yadav, the current director of the NCA.

Brijesh Patel has also been the Hon. Secretary of the Karnataka State Cricket Association (KSCA) since 1999 and controls cricket in Karnataka. Some years ago he was also the Chairman of the National Selection Committee for the Indian national team and resigned after suffering a heart ailment.

Brijesh Patel runs a private cricket coaching academy in Bangalore called B.P.C.A. (Brijesh Patel Cricket Academy), attended by more than 300 boys.

References

External links
 

1952 births
Living people
Indian cricket administrators
Cricketers at the 1975 Cricket World Cup
Cricketers at the 1979 Cricket World Cup
India One Day International cricketers
India Test cricketers
Karnataka cricketers
South Zone cricketers
Wellington cricketers
Indian Universities cricketers
India national cricket team selectors
Bishop Cotton Boys' School alumni
Cricketers from Bangalore
People from Vadodara
Cricketers from Gujarat
Indian cricket coaches 
Indian Premier League cricketers